Kathleen M. O'Toole ( Horton; born May 9, 1954) is an American law enforcement officer who served as Chief of the Seattle Police Department (SPD) from June 23, 2014 to January 4, 2018. She was previously the first female commissioner of the Boston Police Department, when appointed by Mayor of Boston Thomas M. Menino in February 2004.

On May 9, 2006, her 52nd birthday, O'Toole officially announced that she was leaving the Boston Police Department to move to Ireland. She was the first Chief Inspector of the Garda Inspectorate, established to ensure that Garda Síochána operates effectively and efficiently. The Inspectorate reports directly to Ireland's Minister for Justice and Equality. She then returned to the U.S. and took her position in Seattle. O'Toole also sits on the bipartisan advisory board of States United Democracy Center.

Early life and education
O'Toole was born in 1954 in Pittsfield, Massachusetts, and moved to Marblehead at age 13 and to Boston, Massachusetts, at age 18. She resided in Boston from that time until she took a position in Ireland in 2006. O'Toole earned a Bachelor of Arts from Boston College in 1976, a Juris Doctor from New England School of Law in 1982, and a PhD from the Business School of Trinity College Dublin in 2018.

Career
O’Toole began her career in 1979 as a Boston police officer. Her career includes service as Lieutenant Colonel of Massachusetts State Police from 1992 to 1999.  While maintaining her sworn State Police rank, she served from 1994 to 1998 as Massachusetts Secretary of Public Safety in the cabinet of Governor William Weld. She was then appointed to the Patten Commission headed by Lord Patten of Barnes which reformed policing in Northern Ireland and led to the formation of the Police Service of Northern Ireland. In May 2014, she was nominated by Mayor Ed Murray to become Seattle's first female chief of police.

Shooting of Victoria Snelgrove 
While serving as Commissioner of the Boston Police, O'Toole was a central figure in the controversy surrounding the fatal shooting of Victoria Snelgrove during celebrations following the Boston Red Sox victory over the New York Yankees at Yankee Stadium in Game 7 the 2004 American League Championship Series. During attempts to control the crowd that had gathered near Fenway Park, Boston police fired a "less lethal" FN 303 round, which missed its intended target and struck Snelgrove in the eye, resulting in her death approximately 12 hours later.

While Commissioner O'Toole demoted Superintendent James Claiborne, who was not in the vicinity of the shooting, and suspended two officers involved in the incident, no prosecution or dismissal was brought against any officer in the case. Investigations led by former U.S. Attorney Donald K. Stern and Suffolk County District Attorney Daniel F. Conley concluded that criminal charges would not be appropriate.

Garda Inspectorate
The three-member Garda Inspectorate examines operational, investigative, managerial and policing strategies to ensure that these meet best practice. O'Toole's role within the Garda was to clean up the then-current scandalous conditions in the Gardaí. The Morris Tribunal pronounced that it was "staggered" by the level of indiscipline and insubordination in the force and the Irish Government responded with a revised code of discipline. O'Toole served her full term of office and was asked to stay on until the new Chief Inspector could take up his position in July 2012.

Personal life
She is married to Daniel O'Toole, now a retired Boston police detective. They have one daughter, Meghan, who received her undergraduate degree from Boston College and her masters degree from National University of Ireland, Galway.

References

External links

Department of Justice
Garda Síochána
Police Service of Northern Ireland

Massachusetts Secretaries of Public Safety
1954 births
Living people
People from Marblehead, Massachusetts
People from Pittsfield, Massachusetts
Commissioners of the Boston Police Department
Boston College alumni
Women in Massachusetts politics
Chiefs of the Seattle Police Department
American women police officers
21st-century American women